Fafahdun is a town in the southwestern Gedo region of Somalia in the district of Bardera. Town coordinates are 2° 13′ 0″ N, 41° 37′ 0″ E.

History
Fafahdun(Af Soomaali:Faafaxdhuun)is named after the (Faaf, Faafka Faafaxdhuun) or Creek which loops around Fafahdun. The Creek and its many tributaries bring water from mountains in Gowraar grazing areas onto the flat lands near the town. Fafahdun is famous among Somalis as having great numbers of camel. Fafahdun grazing lands is the camel capital of Gedo Region.

Fafadhun Somali Military Base
Fafahdun's proximity to the Kenya's NFD region and border the attention of early 1960s, the Somali government established army base near Fafahdun. From the early 1960s to late 1980s, Fahfahdun was home to Somalia's 63rd Army Division.

Geography and habitat
The town is located in the southwestern part of the country, near El Wak and about 85 miles west of Bardera.

A dust road passing through Fafahdun connects it to Bardera and other areas in the larger Gedo region, as well as the city of Wajir in the Somali-inhabited North Eastern Province of Kenya.

The countryside is home to most of the Gedo region's camel population. About 50 km west of Fafahdun is the famous Gelgesha Prairie, an open flatland as far as the eye can see. Some of the exotic animals found in this prairie area include ostriches, oryx, gerenuks (a particular kind of antelope), warthogs, and a variety of bird species.

Demographics
Fafahdun's population is estimated to around 90.000 inhabitants. Reer Siyaad Hawraarsame and Reer Hassan of the Marehan Clan are well represented. Most of the town's residents are pastoralists who mainly raise camels.

References
Fafahdun

Populated places in Gedo